Hearne Municipal Airport  is a city-owned, public-use airport located one nautical mile (1.85 km) southwest of the central business district of Hearne, a city in Robertson County, Texas, United States.

Although most U.S. airports use the same three-letter location identifier for the FAA and IATA, this airport is assigned LHB by the FAA but has no designation from the IATA.

Facilities and aircraft 
It has one runway designated 18/36 with an asphalt surface measuring 4,001 by 75 feet (1,220 x 23 m). For the 12-month period ending June 8, 2007, the airport had 5,700 general aviation aircraft operations, an average of 15 per day.

References

External links 
  at Texas DOT Airport Directory
 Aerial image as of February 1995 from USGS The National Map

Airports in Texas
Buildings and structures in Robertson County, Texas
Transportation in Robertson County, Texas